is a Japanese doctor and politician of the Liberal Democratic Party, a member of the House of Representatives in the Diet (national legislature). A native of Kyoto, he attended Osaka Medical College and received a Ph.D in medicine. He also studied at the University of Chicago for two years. After working as a doctor, he was elected to the assembly of Kyoto Prefecture for the first time in 1993 where he served for four terms. He was elected to the House of Representatives for the first time in 2005.

References

External links 
 Official website in Japanese.

1946 births
Living people
People from Kyoto
University of Chicago alumni
Japanese surgeons
Koizumi Children
Members of the House of Representatives (Japan)
Members of the Kyoto Prefectural Assembly
Liberal Democratic Party (Japan) politicians